I Have a Dream is a studio album by American Christian and country singer Cristy Lane. It was released in February 1981 via Liberty and LS Records and contained ten tracks. It was the sixth studio effort of Lane's recording career and the first to be issued with the Liberty Records. The project's title track became a top 20 hit on the American country chart in 1981 and the album also reached charting positions itself.

Background and content
Cristy Lane had several years of major country hits during the late 1970s with songs like "Let Me Down Easy" and "I Just Can't Stay Married to You". In 1980, she reached the number one on the country chart with the gospel tune "One Day at a Time". I Have a Dream was inspired by the success of "One Day at a Time" and featured a mixture of country songs and Christian songs. The project contained a total of ten tracks. Its final cut was a medley of popular songs originally performed by Jim Reeves. 

Additionally, the LP's title track was first recorded and made a hit internationally by Swedish pop group ABBA. The album also included cover versions of Ray Price's "For the Good Times" and the pop song "Everything I Own". Christian songs recorded for the album included "Give Them All to Jesus". I Have a Dream was recorded at LSI Studios and Island Recorders, both studio locations in Nashville, Tennessee. The sessions took place between September and December 1980. The album was produced by Jerry Gillespie, Don Grierson and Lee Stoller (Lane's husband and manager).

Release and chart performance
I Have a Dream was released in February 1981 on Liberty Records and LS Records and was her sixth studio album. It was Lane's first studio offering with Liberty, which had previously been under the name United Artists. The project was originally offered as a vinyl LP and a cassette. I Have a Dream was her third album to reach a peak position on the Billboard Country Albums chart in the United States, peaking at number 35. The album was included on Billboards year-end list of top country albums in December 1981. In New Zealand, the album was Lane's first to reach a peak position. The album's title track was issued as its first single in December 1980 on Liberty. The single peaked at number 17 on the Billboard country songs chart, becoming her final top 20 single there. "Love to Love You" was spawned as the album's second single in March 1981. The song peaked at number 21 on the Billboard country songs survey and also reached number 44 on the RPM Country chart in Canada.

Track listing

Personnel
All credits are adapted from the liner notes of I Have a Dream.Musical personnel Eddy Anderson – Drums
 Hayward Bishop – Drums
 Charlie Black – Rhythm guitar, background vocals
 Kenneth Christensen – Keyboards
 Jason Clements – Children's vocals ("I Have a Dream)" 
 Sheri Kramer – Background vocals
 Tommy Cogbil – Electric bass
 Sonny Garrish – Steel guitar
 Steve Gibson – Lead guitar
 Jerry Gillespie – Rhythm guitar
 The Shelly Kurland Strings – Strings
 Cristy Lane – Lead vocals
 Anne Marie – Background vocals
 Steve Messer – Electric bass
 Farrell Morris – Percussion

 Rodger Morris – Keyboards, synthesizer
 Louis Nunley – Background vocals
 Ron Oates – Keyboards 
 Ellen Parker – Children's vocals ("I Have a Dream)"
 Daniel Peterson – Children's vocals ("I Have a Dream)"
 Susie Puett – Children's vocals ("I Have a Dream)" 
 Billy Sanford – Lead guitar, rhythm guitar
 Steve Schaeffer – Electric bass
 Jason Sheridan – Children's vocals ("I Have a Dream)"
 Mike Shannon – Saxophone
 Marquetta Shannon – Children's vocals ("I Have a Dream)" 
 Lisa Silver – Background vocals
 Diane Tidwell – Background vocals
 Jennifer Tidwell – Children's vocals ("I Have a Dream)"Technical personnel'
 Bill Burks – Art direction
 Danny Dunkleberger – Engineering
 Norma and Karen Gerson – Make-up and styling
 Jerry Gillespie – Producer
 Don Grierson – Executive producer
 Jeff Lancaster – Design
 Steve Messer – Engineering
 Ron Oates – String arrangement
 Peak Studio – Photo effects
 Tom Semmes – Engineering
 Dave Shipley – Engineering
 Lee Stoller – Executive producer, manager
 Bergen White – String arrangement

Charts

Release history

References

1981 albums
Albums produced by Jerry Gillespie
Cristy Lane albums
Liberty Records albums
LS Records albums